Lampegan Station (LP) is a class III railway station located in Cimenteng, Campaka, Cianjur Regency. The station, which is located at an altitude of +439 m, is included in the Bandung Operational Area II and is a railway station located in the westernmost part of Cianjur Regency.

The location is expected to boost the tourism sector in Cianjur Regency.

Services
The following is a list of train services at the Lampegan Station.

Passenger services
 Economy class

Incident
Several train schedules had to be canceled.

References

External links

Cianjur Regency
Railway stations in West Java
Railway stations opened in 1883
1880s establishments in the Dutch East Indies